National Confederation of Peasant Workers of Bolivia (CNTCB) was the largest union of peasants in Bolivia from its founding in 1953 until it was superseded by the Unified Syndical Confederation of Rural Workers of Bolivia (CSUTCB) in 1979. The organization's first leaders were Executive Secretary Nuflo Chávez and General Secretary Severo Oblitas, chosen in July 1954. Its highest decision-making body was the Congress; the First Congress was held in La Paz on 3 October 1954; the Second in Santa Cruz in 1963; the third in Ucureña in 1964; and the fourth in Tarabuco in 1967.

References

Trade unions in Bolivia
National federations of trade unions
Trade unions established in 1953
Trade unions disestablished in 1979
1953 establishments in Bolivia